Estadio Nacional de Costa Rica (Costa Rica National Stadium) was a multi-use stadium in La Sabana, San José, Costa Rica. It was used mostly for football matches. The stadium held 25,000 and was built in 1924. It was replaced by the current National Stadium in 2011.

The stadium played host to Amnesty International's Human Rights Now! Benefit Concert on September 13, 1988. The show was headlined by Sting and Peter Gabriel and also featured Bruce Springsteen & The E Street Band, Tracy Chapman, Youssou N'Dour and Guadalupe Urbina.

Lasts Numbers

Last Development

Summer Final Quarters (2007) match between UCR and Brujas FC

Last Penalty

Reynaldo Parks (UCR) at minute 77.

Last Official Goal

The Brazilian, Ronio Martins (UCR) at minute 93.

Last Result

UCR 2 - Brujas FC 3

References

External links
World Stadiums page 
Fussballtempel.net - Photo gallery

Football venues in San José, Costa Rica
Athletics (track and field) venues in Costa Rica
Defunct football venues in Costa Rica